Sensa is a Latin word that means "thought" or "teachings". 

Sensa may also refer to:
 Sensa (diet), a diet aid created by neurologist Alan Hirsch
 The Story of Sensa, a work by Mabel Collins
 Sensa, a character in the interactive fiction game Suspended